Katsepy is a town and commune in Madagascar. It belongs to the district of Mitsinjo, which is a part of Boeny Region. The population of the commune was estimated to be approximately 10,000 in 2001 commune census.

Katsepy has a maritime harbour. It is situated on the opposite side of the Betsiboka River from Mahajanga from where the town can be reached by a ferry.
Only primary schooling is available. Farming and raising livestock provides employment for 40% and 30% of the working population.  The most important crop is rice, while other important products are seeds of catechu and raffia palm.  Services provide employment for 1% of the population. Additionally fishing employs 29% of the population.

Before 2006, one project for building an ethanol plant was started. During two years, all studies are realized.
Actually, the promoter, JWE Ltd, finalized the study and the financial agreement and commenced the construction with international partners.

Malagasy Government agreed this project by the way of EDBM (Economic Development Board of Madagascar) for giving the EPZ/ZFI agreement and by the way of ONE (Office National pour l'ENvironnement) by delivery the Environmental Permit after the EIA Report.

All international partners of JWE Ltd from Indian Ocean, Africa and India will start the project for the malagasy industrial development.

Light House
In Katsepy is found a light house that was constructed in 1901.

References

Populated places in Boeny